This is an overview of Chinese siege weapons.

Siege ladders

Siege ladders were used starting from the Warring States period. A hinged folding ladder known as the "cloud ladder" was quite prominent. Originally it used a counterweight to unfold once within reach of the enemy walls, but the contraption proved to be too vulnerable, and switched to a simple pulling mechanism during the Song dynasty. The newer version had men pull on ropes from behind with the aid of a long pole to move the top ladder into position. Some ladders had a compartment built below it to house soldiers who provided covering fire with crossbows.

Hook carts
Hook carts such as the fork and falcon carts were used to pull down parapets and the top part of walls to make it easier for ladders to access. Once attached, 50 to 100 men took hold of a rope and pulled until the wall came down. They were used as early as the Three Kingdoms period, as mentioned by Chen Lin:

Assault cover
Various protective covers were used during a siege. The most typical were mobile screens and assault wagons. More complex contraptions such as plaited galleries were used for mining and filling in moats.

Observation tower

Static observation towers such as the nest and watchtower carts were used to see into the city. Static towers were also be used in close proximity to enemy walls to rain down projectiles on the defenders.

Mobile siege tower
Mobile siege towers have been used in China since the 6th century BC. They were often called overlook carts, assault carts, or some combination of the two. A typical mobile siege tower was five stories tall mounted on axles with two wheels on each side. The tower was pushed forward by men on the lowest storey or pulled by horses and oxen.

The king of Wu mentioned it in a passage comparing land armies to the navy.

During the Tang dynasty, in the 783 siege of Fengtian, an assault cart 10 meters tall was constructed, protected by layers of cowhide and equipped with leather bags of water to douse fires. It was used in an attempt to breach the city. The defenders managed to dig a trench in front of the siege engine, which tipped it over, and they burnt it and had it destroyed.

In 1132 the Jurchen Jin dynasty constructed assault carts called "sky bridges" during the Siege of De'an, but failed to reach the enemy walls due to the use of long beams to push them away.

The last recorded use of assault carts was in 1851 by the Taiping rebels to besiege Guilin after their first attempt with ladders failed. They mounted cannons on it to bombard the Qing soldiers manning the walls, but the tower was destroyed by a combination of burning oil and long poles wrapped in incendiary material at the ends.

Ram

The Chinese ram used an iron-plated head. After the introduction of gunpowder it added a cannon as well.

Traction trebuchet
The traction trebuchet, also referred to as a mangonel in some sources, is an artillery weapon which derives from manpower its motive force, and was probably used by the Mohists starting from the 4th century BC. Descriptions of it can be found in the Mojing (compiled in the 4th century BC). It consisted of an arm and sling mounted on a wooden frame, sometimes with wheels. Attached to one end of the arm were pulling ropes for men to power the weapon. In Chapter 14 of the Mojing, the traction trebuchet is described hurling hollowed out logs filled with burning charcoal at enemy troops. Trebuchets mounted on wheels were said to have needed 200 men to pull each of them.

By the Qin and Han dynasties, traction trebuchets were a common weapon used in both attack and defense. Later on in 617 Li Mi (Sui dynasty) constructed 300 trebuchets for his assault on Luoyang, in 621 Li Shimin did the same at Luoyang, and onward into the Song dynasty when in 1161, trebuchets operated by Song dynasty soldiers fired bombs of lime and sulphur against the ships of the Jin dynasty navy during the Battle of Caishi.

"Whirlwind" and "four footed" trebuchets appeared during the Tang dynasty. The whirlwind trebuchet used a single vertical pole which could be rotated 360 degrees for increased versatility at the cost of projectile strength. The four footed trebuchets were essentially the same as the previous Warring States weapons, differentiated from the whirlwinds by specifying its stability and larger size.

As defensive weapons, traction trebuchets were positioned behind city walls and guided by an "artillery observer" on the walls. Range was determined by the strength and number of men pulling. Increasing and decreasing range meant adding and removing men from the pulling ropes.

The traction trebuchet continued to be used until the counterweight trebuchet was introduced in 1272 during the Mongol conquest of the Song dynasty.

Wheel catapult
A military engineer of the Three Kingdoms period, Ma Jun, devised a device which threw large stones using a wheel. This device consisted of a drum wheel attached with a curved knife. When rotated, the stones which hung on the wheel would be cut loose by the knife and launched. It is not clear how well this device worked in practice. Successful tests with roof tiles instead of stones are mentioned, but according to Liang Jieming, this contraption never made it past the testing phase and could not have been possible with the available technology at the time.

Counterweight trebuchet

The introduction of the counterweight trebuchet in China is usually attributed to Muslim engineers during the Battle of Xiangyang in 1273, but it is possible that it was independently invented earlier in 1232 by the Jurchen Jin commander Qiang Shen. Qiang Shen invented a device called the "Arresting Trebuchet" which only needed a few men to work it, and could hurl great stones more than a hundred paces, further than even the strongest traction trebuchet. However no details on the construction of the machine are given. Qiang died the following year and no further references to the Arresting Trebuchet appear. Even earlier, a Song officer, Wei Sheng, had invented a trebuchet in 1176 that could hurl stones and gunpowder projectiles some 200 paces.

The counterweight trebuchet, known as the Muslim trebuchet (or Huihui Pao) in China, replaced the traction version after its introduction in the late 13th century. Its greater range was however, somewhat countered by the fact that it had to be constructed at the site of the siege unlike traction trebuchets, which were easier to take apart and put back together again where necessary.

The counterweight trebuchet remained in use in China for roughly two centuries, at which point it was well on its way to obsolescence.

Mounted crossbow

Large crossbows called "bed crossbows" were mounted on rectangular frameworks, often wheeled. Bowstaves were also sometimes combined to increase tension and initial velocity of the bolt.

Bed crossbow
Large mounted crossbows known as "bed crossbows" were used as early as the Warring States period. Mozi described them as defensive weapons placed on top the battlements. The Mohist siege crossbow was described as humongous device with frameworks taller than a man and shooting arrows with cords attached so that they could be pulled back.  By the Han dynasty, crossbows were used as mobile field artillery and known as "Military Strong Carts". Around the 5th century AD, multiple bows were combined to increase draw weight and length, thus creating the double and triple bow crossbows. Tang versions of this weapon are stated to have obtained a range of 1,160 yards, which is supported by Ata-Malik Juvayni on the use of similar weapons by the Mongols in 1256. According Juvayni, Hulagu Khan brought with him 3,000 giant crossbows from China, for the siege of Nishapur, and a team of Chinese technicians to work a great 'ox bow' shooting large bolts a distance of 2,500 paces, which was used at the siege of Maymun Diz. Constructing these weapons, especially the casting of the large triggers, and their operation required the highest order of technical expertise available at the time. They were primarily used from the 8th to 11th centuries. The bed crossbow has been compared with the ballista elephant that can seen on the bas-relief of the 13th century Bayon in Cambodia.

Joseph Needham on the range of the triple-bow crossbow:

Multiple bolt crossbow
The multiple bolt crossbow appeared around the late 4th century BC. A passage dated to 320 BC states that it was mounted on a three-wheeled carriage and stationed on the ramparts. The crossbow was drawn using a treadle and shot 10 foot long arrows. Other drawing mechanisms such as winches and oxen were also used. Later on pedal release triggers were also used. Although this weapon was able to discharge multiple bolts, it was at the cost of reduced accuracy. It had a maximum range of 500 yards.

When Qin Shi Huang's magicians failed to get in touch with "spirits and immortals of the marvellous islands of the Eastern Sea", they excused themselves by saying large monsters blocked their way. Qin Shi Huang personally went out with a multiple bolt crossbow to see these monsters for himself. He found no monsters but killed a big fish.

In 99 BC, they were used as field artillery against attacking nomadic cavalry.

In 759 AD, Li Quan described a type of multiple bolt crossbow capable of destroying ramparts and city towers:

In 950 AD, Tao Gu described multiple crossbows connected by a single trigger:

The weapon was considered obsolete by 1530.

Incendiaries

Prior to the introduction of gunpowder, fire arrows used mineral oil and sulphur as incendiaries. They were most commonly used by defenders to burn enemy siege engines such as ladders and rams. They were also used to create fires in defending cities.

Gunpowder

When gunpowder arrived in the 10th century, fire arrows switched to gunpowder incendiaries. Production of gunpowder and fire arrows heavily increased in the 11th century as the court centralized the production process, constructing large gunpowder production facilities, hiring artisans, carpenters, and tanners for the military production complex in the capital of Kaifeng. One surviving source circa 1023 lists all the artisans working in Kaifeng while another notes that in 1083 the imperial court sent 100,000 gunpowder arrows to one garrison and 250,000 to another. When the Jin captured Kaifeng in 1126 they captured 20,000 fire arrows for their arsenal.

Gunpowder was also used in fire balls launched by trebuchets. "Barbed fire balls" used a series of hooks to latch onto its target. A "molten metal bomb" also saw use during the Jin siege of Kaifeng in 1126. These were ceramic containers filled with molten metal kept in a mobile furnace.

Fire birds were a form of live delivery system for incendiaries. A walnut sized piece of burning tinder was tied to the birds' neck or leg. The idea was that once released, they would settle on the roofs of the enemy city, setting fire to the thatch.

The fire ox was another live delivery system. The ox was let loose with two spears attached to its sides and an incendiary tied to its behind. Later on a delayed-action bomb was also added.

Greek fire entered the Chinese arsenal around the year 900. The flamethrower consisted of a brass container and a horizontal pump connected to the gunpowder ignition chamber. When pushed, the pump caused burning petrol to squirt out. It was recommended that these devices be placed on the walls so that when rolls of straw were thrown at siege engines, they would be ignited by the petrol fire. Flamethrowers were also used at sea, sometimes disastrously. In 975 the commander of Southern Tang's navy panicked when enemy ships assaulted them with a barrage of arrows. In desperation, he projected petrol from flamethrowers at the enemy, but a sudden northern wind blew the flames in the opposite direction, setting his entire fleet ablaze. The commander jumped into the fire and died.

Chemical warfare
Gas bombs consisting of gunpowder mixed with various poisons wrapped in hemp and moxa were used as defensive weapons. These were said to cause great discomfort in the enemy, having effects such as bleeding from the mouth and nose. Other than poison, lime and excrement were also used for their noxious and blinding properties.

Various defensive measures

References

Bibliography
 
 
 
 .
 
 
 .
 
 .
 
 
 .
 
 .
 .
 .
 
 
 .
 Hadden, R. Lee. 2005. "Confederate Boys and Peter Monkeys." Armchair General. January 2005. Adapted from a talk given to the Geological Society of America on March 25, 2004.
 
 .
 .
 
 .
 .
 
 
 
 .
 
 
 
 
 
 
 .
 

 
 .
 
 
 
 
 .
 .
 
 .
 .
 
 .
 
 
 
 
 
 Schmidtchen, Volker (1977a), "Riesengeschütze des 15. Jahrhunderts. Technische Höchstleistungen ihrer Zeit", Technikgeschichte 44 (2): 153–173 (153–157)
 Schmidtchen, Volker (1977b), "Riesengeschütze des 15. Jahrhunderts. Technische Höchstleistungen ihrer Zeit", Technikgeschichte 44 (3): 213–237 (226–228)
 .
 
 
 
 .
 
 
 
 
 
 
 

Military history of China
Weapons of China
Siege weapons